The Upper Reka Albanian dialect is a member of the wider northern Albanian Gheg dialect subgroup of the Albanian language spoken by northern Albanians. Speakers of the dialect are mainly located within the territory of the sub-region of Upper Reka in north-western North Macedonia. Due to the geographical isolation of the Upper Reka region, the Upper Reka dialect also developed linguistic peculiarities that differentiate it from other varieties of Albanian. Within the Gheg dialects, the Upper Reka dialect is classified as a Central Gheg dialect, along with the dialects of the Kruja, Mati and Dibra regions.

Linguistic characteristics

Phonology
The Upper Reka Albanian dialect contains phonological and morphological characteristics that are unique of speakers in Albanian within Upper Reka. For example, the Albanian letter  (in Standard Albanian) often voiced as a hard  sound in some Northern dialects is articulated as a soft  sound in Upper Reka. Unlike Northern Albanian dialects, which mainly pronounce the Albanian characters as a hard sound, in Upper Reka it is at times rendered as a soft sound, reminiscent of some Southern Albanian dialects. The cluster  as in the word djathë (cheese) are also substituted for a  sound (i.e. *gjathë) in certain instances. The consonant cluster  as in plak (old), pleh (manure) and plis (pileus) of the Reka dialect has been replaced in certain instances with  causing words to be pronounced as ptak, pteh and ptis. The sound cluster  word internally like tepsi ("large baking pan/tray") is in the Upper Reka dialect partially nasalized into   making words to be pronounced for example as temtsi.

Unlike in some Albanian dialects (typically Northern), where the sound cluster  has contracted into , in Upper Reka it is maintained in words like katund (spread out village), nder (honour) and vend (place). Like most Gheg dialects, the Upper Reka dialect has also retained the nasal vocalisation of vowels ā (often a schwa:   in Standard Albanian) and ō, so that words like dhëmb (tooth), dhëndër (groom) and këmb (foot) are pronounced as dhāmb, dhōndr and kōmb. Also the  sound which in most Albanian dialects is pronounced 
as a glottal fricative, is realized as a guttural "hard"   in Upper Reka.

Morphology and Syntax
The Upper Reka dialect uses do to create its future tense, as do most Tosk dialects as well as certain other Gheg dialects, including all of Southern Gheg (i.e. Tirana and Elbasan dialects), the Northwestern Gheg dialect of Shkreli, the Northeastern Gheg dialects of the Has and Luma regions, and the Northern Gheg of Mirdita.

Education and Literature

The earliest known example of the Upper Reka Albanian dialect being employed in writing is from an Orthodox graveyard headstone inscription written in Cyrillic script at Duf which dates from 1889. While an ethnographic work by Bajazid Elmaz Doda from Štirovica titled Albanisches Bauerleben im oberen Rekatal bei Dibra (Makedonien)/Albanian Peasant Life in the Upper Reka Valley near Dibra (Macedonia) was completed in 1914. It contains information about culture, customs, language and other facets of life of Upper Reka during the late Ottoman period.  Found within the Austrian archives in 2007, Robert Elsie postulates that the original script may have been translated into German from Albanian due to the amount of Albanian vocabulary contained in the German version. Elsie contends that the work was the first to employ the Upper Reka Albanian dialect in literature and composed at a time when little Albanian literature had been produced. The work has been praised by Elsie and other scholars like Andrea Pieroni for its detailed and important information of Upper Reka. The first attested example of Albanian literature being present in Upper Reka is a 19th-century Albanian language gospel text (New Testament) written in the Greek alphabet held in a church in the village of Duf. During the monarchist Yugoslav era, schooling was done in the Serbian language and none existed in Albanian.

Language usage

Starting in the 1950s, Albanians in Upper Reka were forced to send their children to schooling in Macedonian, with the goal of assimilating them. It was reported that during that period, many Albanian children cried when they came home from school and tried to refuse to attend, because they didn't understand the language.

Most Upper Reka inhabitants do not have complete command of higher registers of the Albanian language, as higher level Albanian vocabulary remains unknown to them. Instead, Macedonian words are used, especially for modern household items or designating certain modern concepts.

In the 2000s, there are elderly Upper Reka women who still have some knowledge of Serbian, though not of Macedonian. Muslim Albanians residing in Upper Reka in the 2010s are to varying degrees also bilingual in Macedonian. Of the Orthodox population residing in Upper Reka in the 2000s, in terms of daily speech were mainly fluent in Albanian among themselves and even the young. Reading and writing in Macedonian is known by the population, with the young making use of it, while literacy skills in Albanian by all age groups are non-existent. Most of the Orthodox population from Upper Reka living outside the region is knowledgeable in Albanian such as in areas of the Former Yugoslavia. Very few of them reveal that information though, due to negative perceptions of the Albanian language within host societies where they currently reside and their integration into Macedonian society through sharing a common Orthodox Christian heritage. Among the wider Macedonian population, there is little awareness of the existence of an Orthodox Christian population which uses Albanian as a language of everyday communication. Due to the legacy of seasonal migration for work, trade and emigration, Upper Reka people have become multilingual over time in various languages including Turkish, Greek, Serbian, Bulgarian, Romanian, French and English.

See also
Culture of Upper Reka
Albanian dialects
Reka dialect - Macedonian dialect of Lower Reka

References

Citations

Sources

Further reading
Doda, Bajazid Elmaz (2007). Albanisches Bauerleben im oberen Rekatal bei Dibra (Makedonien) [Albanian Peasant Life in the Upper Reka Valley near Dibra (Macedonia)]. Lit-Verlag. 
Islami, Abaz (2011). "Aspekte Demografike të Rekës nga shekulli XV - 2002 [Demographic Aspects of Reka from the 15th century -2002]". Studime Albanologjike. 3
Mirčevska, Mirjana P. (2003, 2007). Verbalni i neverbalni etnički simboli vo Gorna Reka [Verbal and non-verbal ethnic symbols in Upper Reka]. Institut za Etnologija i Antropologija. Skopje. 
Pajaziti, Ali, et al. (2014). Shqiptarët e Rekës së Epërm përballë sfidave të kohës [Albanians of Upper Reka facing the challenges of time]. South East European University. Gostivar-Skopje. 
Murati, Qemal (2011). "Gjuha e humbur: Vëzhgime historike, linguistike, onomastike dhe folklorike rreth shqiptarëve ortodoksë në etnoregjionin e Rekës së Epërme të Mavrovës [Lost Language: Historical, Linguistic, Onomastic and Folkloric observations about the Orthodox Albanians in ethno-region of Upper Reka in Mavrovo]". Studime Albanologjike. 3

Albanian dialects
Languages of North Macedonia